The Laelapidae are a family of mites in the order Mesostigmata. The family is also referred to in the literature as Laelaptidae, which may be the correct spelling.

Description 
Laelapidae have a shield covering all or most of the dorsal surface (holodorsal shield). Ventrally, there is a sternal shield with 3 pairs of setae, a tongue- or flask-shaped genital shield (greatly expanded in Ololaelaps) with usually at least 1 pair of setae, and a small anal shield with 3 circumanal setae. The peritremes are typically long and the peritrematal shields often narrow.

Ecology 
Laelapidae is the most ecologically diverse group of Mesostigmata. As of 2012, there were ten laelapid genera known to be free-living predators in soil, thirty-five that are ectoparasites on mammals (e.g. rodents) and forty-three have species associated with arthropods. Laelapidae are the only family in superfamily Dermanyssoidea to include free-living predators.

Among the arthropod-associated laelapids are taxa associated with bees. Raymentia are associated with Lasioglossum sweat bees and may be pollen-feeders, Neohypoaspis are predators on astigmatid mites in stingless bee nests, Pneumolaelaps feed on pollen and nectar in bumblebee nests, Melittiphis alvearius feeds on pollen in European honeybee nests and Tropilaelaps are obligatory parasites of honeybees.

Other arthropod-associated laelapids include species of Hypoaspis sensu lato associated with burrowing cockroaches and Julolaelaps moseri which was collected from a millipede of family Spirostreptidae.

Biological control 
Several species of Laelapidae are used commercially as biological control agents of pests, and others are being studied for the same purpose. Examples include Gaeolaelaps aculeifer and Stratiolaelaps scimitus, used to control various pests in soil (thrips pupae, fly maggots, bulb mites), and pests of mushrooms (fungus gnats) and poultry (poultry red mite).

Genera

 Aetholaelaps Strandtmann & Camin, 1956
 Alphalaelaps Radford, 1951
 Andreacarus Radford, 1953
 Androlaelaps Berlese, 1903
 Angosomaspis Costa, 1971
 Atricholaelaps Ewing, 1929
 Austrolaelaps Womersley, 1956
 Berlesia G.Canestrini, 1884
 Bewsiella Domrow, 1958
 Bisternalis Hunter, 1963
 Blaberolaelaps M. Costa, 1980
 Bolivilaelaps Fonseca, 1940
 Camerolaelaps Fonseca, 1960
 Cavilaelaps Fonseca, 1935
 Cerambylaelaps M.Costa, 1979
 Chalaza R. Domrow, 1990
 Chamolaelaps Hull, in F.Türk & S.Türk 1952
 Chapalania Hoffmann & Lopez-Campos, 1995
 Chelanyssus Zumpt & Till, 1953
 Chirolaelaps A. C. G. Heath, D. M. Bishop & M. J. Daniel, 1987
 Chrysochlorolaelaps Evans & Till, 1966
 Coleolaelaps Berlese, 1914
 Conolaelaps Womersley, 1959
 Cosmiphis Vitzthum, 1926
 Cyclolaelaps Ewing, 1933
 Cyclothorax von Frauenfeld, 1868
 Cypholaelaps Berlese, 1916
 Dianolaelaps Y. M. Gu & Q. X. Duan, 1990
 Dicrocheles Krantz & Khot, 1962
 Dinogamasus Kramer, 1898
 Dipolaelaps Zemskaya & Piontkovskaya, 1960
 Domrownyssus Evans & Till, 1966
 Donia Oudemans, 1939
 Dynastaspis Costa, 1971
 Dynatochela Keegan, 1950
 Dyscinetonyssus Moss & Funk, 1965
 Echinolaelaps Ewing, 1929
 Echinonyssus Hirst, 1925
 Ellsworthia Türk, 1945
 Eubrachylaelaps Ewing, 1929
 Eugynolaelaps Berlese, 1918
 Eumellitiphis Türk, 1948
 Gaeolaelaps Evans & Till, 1966
 Gammaridacarus Canaris, 1962
 Garmania Nesbitt, 1951
 Gecarcinolaelaps Casanueva, 1993
 Geneiadolaelaps Ewing, 1929
 Gigantolaelaps Fonseca, 1939
 Gopriphis Berlese, 1910
 Halbertia Türk & Türk, 1952
 Hunteracarus Costa, 1975
 Hunteria M. Delfinado-Baker, E. W. Baker & C. H. W. Flechtmann, 1984
 Hyletastes Gistel, 1848
 Hymenolaelaps Furman, 1972
 Hypoaspis G.Canestrini, 1884
 Ichoronyssus Kolenati, 1858
 Iphiolaelaps Womersley, 1956
 Iphiopsis Berlese, 1882
 Jacobsonia Berlese, 1910
 Japanoasternolaelaps W. Hirschmann & N. Hiramatsu, 1984
 Jordensia Oudemans, 1937
 Julolaelaps Berlese, 1916
 Laelantennus Berlese, 1903
 Laelaps C.L.Koch, 1836
 Laelapsella Womersley, 1955
 Laelapsoides Willmann, 1952
 Laelaspoides Eickwort, 1966
 Laelaspulus Berlese, 1903
 Ligialaelaps Radford, 1942
 Liponysella Hirst, 1925
 Ljunghia Oudemans, 1932
 Longolaelaps Vitzthum, 1926
 Lucanaspis Costa, 1971
 Lukoschus Radovsky & Gettinger, 1999
 Mabuyonyssus Till, 1957
 Macrolaelaps Ewing, 1929
 Manisilaelaps Lavoipierre, 1956
 Meliponaspis Vitzthum, 1930
 Melittiphis Berlese, 1918
 Melittiphisoides M. Delfinado-Baker, E. W. Baker & C. H. W. Flechtmann, 1984
 Mesolaelaps Hirst, 1926
 Metaspinolaelaps Till, 1958
 Mungosicola Radford, 1942
 Myonyssoides Hirst, 1925
 Myonyssus Tiraboschi, 1904
 Myrmeciphis Hull, 1923
 Myrmolaelaps Trägårdh, 1906
 Myrmosleichus Berlese, 1903
 Myrmozercon Berlese, 1902
 Mysolaelaps Fonseca, 1935
 Nakhoda Domrow & Nadchatram, 1975
 Narceolaelaps J. B. Kethley, 1978
 Neoberlesia Berlese, 1892
 Neohypoaspis M. Delfinado-Baker, E. W. Baker & D. W. Roubik, 1983
 Neolaelaps Hirst, 1926
 Neoparalaelaps Fonseca, 1935
 Neospinolaelaps Zumpt & Patterson, 1952
 Notolaelaps Womersley, 1957
 Oloiphis Berlese, 1916
 Ondatralaelaps Evans & Till, 1965
 Ornitholaelaps Okereke, 1968
 Oryctolaelaps Lange, in Bregetova et al., 1955
 Parabisternalis Ueckermann & Loots, 1995
 Peramelaelaps Womersley, 1956
 Phytojacobsonia Vitzthum, 1925
 Pililaelaps Radford, 1947
 Pleisiolaelaps Womersley, 1957
 Pneumolaelaps Berlese, 1920
 Podolaelaps Berlese, 1888
 Praeparasitus Berlese, 1916
 Promacrolaelaps Costa, 1971
 Pseudolaelaps Berlese, 1916
 Pseudoparasitus Oudemans, 1902
 Qinghailaelaps Y. M. Gu & X. Z. Yang, 1984
 Radfordilaelaps Zumpt, 1949
 Raymentia Womersley, 1956
 Reticulolaelaps Costa, 1968
 Rhinolaelaps Fonseca, 1960
 Rhodacantha R. Domrow, 1979
 Rhyzolaelaps Bregetova & Grokhovskaya, 1961
 Scissuralaelaps Womersley, 1945
 Scolopendracarus Evans, 1955
 Scorpionyssus Fain & G. Rack, 1988
 Sinolaelaps Y. M. Gu & C. S. Wang, 1979
 Sphaeroseius Berlese, 1904
 Stamfordia Trägårdh, 1906
 Steptolaelaps Furman, 1955
 Sternolaelaps Zumpt & Patterson, 1951
 Stevelus Hunter, 1963
 Stigmatolaelaps Krantz, 1998
 Stratiolaelaps Berlese, 1916
 Tengilaelaps Gu & Wang, 1996
 Tricholaelaps Vitzthum, 1926
 Tropilaelaps Delfinado & Baker, 1961
 Tur Baker & Wharton, 1952
 Turkiella Zumpt & Till, 1953
 Tylolaelaps Y. M. Gu & C. S. Wang, 1979
 Ugandolaelaps Radford, 1942
 Uroiphis Berlese, 1903
 Urozercon Berlese, 1901
 Xylocolaelaps Royce & Krantz, 2003
 Zontia Türk, 1948
 Zygolaelaps V. J. Tipton, 1957

References

External links

 
Mesostigmata